Scymnus binotulatus, is a species of beetle in the family Coccinellidae. It is found in Oceania and Southern Asia.

References 

Coccinellidae
Beetles described in 1859